Anthene seltuttus, the dark ciliate blue, is a butterfly of the family Lycaenidae. It is found in Australia, New Guinea, Indonesia and a number of bordering Pacific islands.

The wingspan is about 25 mm.

The larvae feed on Cassia fistula, Pongamia pinnata, Cryptocarya hypospodia, Lagerstroemia speciosa, Syzygium wilsonii, Cupaniopsis anacardioides and Brachychiton acerifolium.

Subspecies
A. s. seltuttus (Aru, Waigeu, Salawati, Jobi, West Irian to New Guinea, Fergusson, Woodlark, Trobriand Island)
A. s. affinis (Waterhouse & Turner, 1905) (Australia from Cape York to Yeppoon, Northern Territory)
A. s. amboinensis (Butler, 1899) (Ambon, Obi, Bachan, Halmahera, Ternate)
A. s. keyensis Tite, 1966 (Kai Island, Watubela Island)
A. s. violacea (Butler, 1899) (Yela Island, Tagula, St. Aignan Island)

References

External links
 Australian Caterpillars

Anthene
Butterflies described in 1886
Butterflies of Oceania
Taxa named by Julius Röber